Barry Rose is a former wide receiver in the National Football League. Rose was drafted in the tenth round of the 1992 NFL Draft by the Buffalo Bills and would play with the Denver Broncos during the 1993 NFL season. Later he would play with the Hamilton Tiger-Cats of the Canadian Football League in 1995 and was drafted by the London Monarchs of the World League of American Football in 1997. He was inducted into the University of Wisconsin-Stevens Point Athletics Hall of Fame in 2006.

References

People from Hudson, Wisconsin
Players of American football from Wisconsin
Denver Broncos players
Hamilton Tiger-Cats players
American football wide receivers
Wisconsin–Stevens Point Pointers football players
1968 births
Living people